WRLS-FM (92.3 FM) is a radio station licensed to serve the community of Hayward, Wisconsin, United States.  The station's broadcast license is held by Vacationland Broadcasting, Inc.

WRLS-FM broadcasts an adult contemporary music format to the greater Hayward, Wisconsin-Spooner, Wisconsin, area. The station airs select news programming from NBC News Radio.  WRLS-FM airs the National Football League games of the Green Bay Packers as an affiliate of the Packers Radio Network.

The station was assigned the call sign WRLS-FM by the Federal Communications Commission on January 15, 1980.

References

External links
WRLS-FM official website

RLS-FM
Mainstream adult contemporary radio stations in the United States
Sawyer County, Wisconsin